Maxim Februari, pseudonym of Maximiliaan (Max) Drenth (born 23 February 1963), is a Dutch writer, philosopher and columnist.

Life and work 
Februari studied law, philosophy and history of art at Utrecht University. His first novel (De zonen van het uitzicht), for which he received the Multatuli Prize, was published in 1989. Februari's next novel The Book Club (Dutch: De literaire kring) was published in 2007. He  wrote columns for two leading Dutch newspapers, de Volkskrant and NRC Handelsblad.
Februari published a highly original dissertation at Tilburg University in 2000. This book (Een pruik van paardenhaar & Over het lezen van een boek, Amartya Sen en de Onmogelijkheid van de Paretiaanse liberaal) was a combination of a scientific book and a novel, both on economics and on ethics –and published under two names: M. Februari & Marjolijn Drenth.
In 2008 Februari received the Frans Kellendonk Prize, a Dutch literary award.
Februari gave the 2011 Mosse Lecture, titled Wat is seks eigenlijk? (What exactly is sex?).

 Gender transitioning 
Newspaper NRC-Handelsblad announced in September 2012 that their columnist Marjolijn Februari would from then on publish under the name Maxim Februari, because of his gender transitioning. Februari published The Making of a Man. Notes on Transsexuality (Dutch: De maakbare man. Notities over transseksualiteit) in 2013.

 Publications in English 
 Maxim Februari: The Making of a Man. Notes on Transsexuality. (Transl. by Andy Brown).  London, Reaktion Books, 2015.   
 Marjolijn Februari: The Book Club. (Transl. by Paul Vincent). London, Quercus, 2011.   
 Globalisation and Human Dignity. Sources and Challenges in Catholic Social Thought''. An essay by Marjolijn Drenth von Februar, with contrib. by Wim van de Donk [and others]. Budel, Damon, 2004.

References

External links 

 
 Februari @dbnl
 A brief summary (in Dutch) of a three-hour interview by the dutch program 'Zomergasten':

1963 births
20th-century Dutch novelists
20th-century Dutch male writers
21st-century Dutch novelists
Dutch columnists
Dutch LGBT novelists
Living people
People from Coevorden
Tilburg University alumni
Transgender men
Transgender writers
Utrecht University alumni
Dutch male novelists
21st-century Dutch male writers